The 47th FIE Fencing World Cup began in October 2017 and concluded in July 2018 at the 2018 World Fencing Championships held in Wuxi. Of the 153 national federations in the International Fencing Federation (FIE), 108 were represented in Wuxi with 771 athletes participating.

Individual épée

Top 8

Individual foil

Top 8

Individual sabre

Top 8

Team épée

Top 8

Team foil

Top 8

Team sabre

Top 8

References

External links
FIE homepage

Fencing World Cup
2017 in fencing
2018 in fencing